Kapek is a Polish language surname. Notable people with the name include:

 Antje Kapek (1976), German politician
 Julien Kapek (1979), French triple jumper

References 

Polish-language surnames